Ill is a river of Saarland, Germany. It flows through Eppelborn, and discharges into the Theel near Lebach.

See also
List of rivers of Saarland

Rivers of Saarland
Rivers of Germany